Anatolii Volodymyrovych Mohyliov (born 6 April 1955) is a Ukrainian politician. He is the former Prime Minister of Crimea and former Ukrainian Minister of Internal Affairs.

Politics
Mohyliov graduated school in Slovyansk in 1972 and the Slovyansk Pedagogical Institute (today part of the Donbas State Pedagogical University) in 1977 obtaining diploma as a teacher of physics. In 1977–79 he worked as a teacher of physics in a village of Tsvitochne (Bilohirsk Raion, Crimean Oblast) before being drafted to the army. In 1979–81 Mohyliov served in the air defense service for the Leningrad Military District. After demobilization, he for a brief stint returned to be a teacher in Slovyansk, before changing occupation to law enforcement (militsiya) in 1982.

In 1995–2000 Mohyliov served as a chief militsiya officer for the city of Artemivsk and then until 2005 for the city of Makiivka. In 2007, he served as deputy interior minister and chief of the Ukrainian Interior Ministry's main office (head of militsiya) in the Autonomous Republic of Crimea. (Despite Ukrainian policeman are forbidden to be actively involved with politics) Mohyliov headed the Crimean campaign headquarters of presidential candidate Viktor Yanukovych during the 2010 presidential election campaign.

On March 16, 2010 Mustafa Djemilev reminded the Minister of Internal Affairs of Anatolii Mohyliov official xenophobic statements in the local press against the Crimean Tatar population in the past for which the Mejlis (Crimean Tatar parliament) has already prepared a petition to the Prosecutor General of Ukraine. If they fail to condemn Mohyliov's statements, the Mejlis will consider filing in a complaint with the European Court for Human Rights in Strasbourg. The Kharkiv Human Rights Group has criticized his period as Interior Minister.

A resolution on the dismissal of Mohyliov did not receive enough votes (141 out of 450) in the Ukrainian Parliament on June 15, 2010.

On November 7, 2011 President Viktor Yanukovych nominated Mohyliov as Prime Minister of Crimea. The Supreme Council of Crimea appointed him to this post the next day. Mustafa Djemilev described his appointment "stupid; Mohyliov is remembered for praising the Stalin-era deportations of the Crimean Tatars, as well as the shooting of unarmed people in 2007 by police under his command". Mohyliov was elected the leader of the Crimean branch of Party of Regions on 29 November 2011.

On November 18, 2012, Anatoliy Mohiliov openly stated that Militsia of Ukraine "supports interests of the political force that currently is in power (government), because the power (government) ensures stability and normal life in the country."

On February 27, 2014, he and his entire cabinet known as Council of Ministers of Crimea were dismissed by the Supreme Council amid the 2014 Crimean crisis. In the context of the Crimean crisis, pro-Russian forces compelled the crimean Parliament to hold an emergency closed-door session that overthrew Mohyliov and appointed pro-Russian Sergei Aksyonov as the new president of Crimea. Mohyliov was barred from attending this Supreme Council session. He was replaced by Sergey Aksyonov. After his dismissal Mohyliov stayed three more days in Crimea before he relocated to Kyiv. In Kyiv he became head of a civil organization which provides legal assistance to former security forces employees.

Racist comments 
Mohyliov has been criticized for making a variety of Tatarophobic comments, to an extent that he was put in the list of the 14 most prominent Tatarophobes by Avdet for praising the deportation of the Crimean Tatars and calling them "sub-human". Earlier, he made the claim that a fairly large diaspora of Crimean Tatars inhabit Crimea, perpetrating the notion that they are foreigners in their homeland.

References

External links

Volatile appointment for the Crimea – Opinion piece by member of the Kharkiv Human Rights Group Halya Coynash about Mohyliov's appointment as Prime Minister of Crimea (Kyiv Post, 9 November 2011)

1955 births
Living people
People from Petropavlovsk-Kamchatsky
Russian emigrants to Ukraine
Interior ministers of Ukraine
Prime Ministers of Crimea
Party of Regions politicians
Recipients of the Order of Merit (Ukraine), 3rd class
Colonel Generals of Ukraine